MJW may refer to:

 Malcolm-Jamal Warner (born 1970), American actor
 Mary Jane Watson, a supporting character appearing in American comic books published by Marvel Comics
 Michael Jai White (born 1967), American actor, writer, director, producer, stunt coordinator and martial artist
 Mak Joon Wah (born 1942), Malaysian physician
 Matthew J. Walsh (1882–1963), American priest
 Max Joseph Wagenbauer (1775–1829), Bavarian artist
 Michael J. Waldvogel, American lacrosse player
 Michael J. Wallrich (1857–1941), Republican politician in the U.S. State of Wisconsin
 Michael J Walsh, American designer and creative director
 Martin Joseph Ward (born 1991), English professional boxer
 Michael J. Ward (born 1950/1951), American railroad executive
 Michael J. Warner (1843–1919), Democratic politician in the U.S. State of Wisconsin
 Mary Jane Warnes (1877–1959), Australian women's rights activists
 M J Warsi, Indian linguist, researcher, and author
 Martin J. Weber (1905–2007), American inventor
 Matt J. Wedel, American paleontologist
 Michael J. Weithorn (born 1956), American writer, director, and producer
 M J Whelan (born 1931), British scientist
 Michael J. Whitley (died 2000), American naval historian
 Marshall Jay Williams (1837–1902), Republican politician in the U.S. State of Ohio
 Maurice John Willis (1900–1975), Canadian educator and political figure
 Mary Jane Wilson (1840–1916), Englishwoman born in India who founded a religious order, the Franciscan Sisters of Our Lady of Victory
 Margaret J. Winkler (1895–1990), American film producer
 Martin J. Wygod (born 1940), American businessman and a prominent Thoroughbred racehorse owner/breeder
 Michael J. Wytrwal (1882–1970), American banker
 Mark J. Williams (born 1975), Welsh professional snooker player